The Seven Eleven Scholastic School is an English medium school in Mira Road, Mumbai, India. It was established in 2013 by the Seven Eleven Group. The school offers the ICSE board syllabus for standard X students.

References

External links
SESS Official site

Schools in Mumbai
Private schools in Mumbai
Educational institutions established in 2013
2013 establishments in Maharashtra